Playing with the Devil is a 1956 Czech fairy-tale comedy film by Josef Mach based on a 1945 play by Jan Drda. Set decorations were painted by Josef Lada.

Cast
Josef Bek as Martin Kabát
Eva Klepáčová as Maid Káča
Alena Vránová as Princess Dišperanda
František Smolík as Školastykus
Jaroslav Vojta as Sarka Farka
Bohuš Záhorský as King
Stanislav Neumann as Omnimor
František Filipovský as Karborund
Josef Vinklář as Lucius
Ladislav Pešek as Belzebub
Vladimír Ráž as Solfernus
Rudolf Deyl, Jr. as Belial
Antonín Šůra as Theofil
Josef Mixa as Hubert
Jiřina Bílá as Farmer's wife with food

Other adaptations
In 1979, another film adaptation was made in Poland and continues to be popular. It was directed by Tadeusz Lis and starred well-known Polish actors Janusz Gajos, Jerzy Kamas, Marian Kociniak and Marek Kondrat.

References

External links
 

Czechoslovak comedy films
Czech fantasy comedy films
1950s fantasy comedy films
1957 comedy films
1957 films
Demons in film
The Devil in film
Films set in hell
Films based on fairy tales
1950s Czech-language films